Sisters is a 1992 album from US country duo Sweethearts of the Rodeo. The only Billboard charting hits on Sisters were minor, with "Hard-Headed Man" at #63 and "Devil and Your Deep Blue Eyes" at #74.

Reception 

In his Allmusic review, critic Thom Owen called the album "a subtle, sweet album of introspective folk-laced country, highlighted by the lovely harmonies."

Track listing
"Why Should I Stay Blue" (Mike Reid, Rory Michael Bourke) – 2:35
"Hard-Headed Man" (Andy Landis, Don Schlitz) – 3:18
"I Don't Stay Down for Long" (Janis Oliver Gill, Wendy Waldman) – 3:06
"Man of My Dreams" (Janis Oliver Gill) – 3:18
"A Woman Can Tell" (Every Time)" (Janis Oliver Gill, Andy Landis) – 2:53
"Have I Done Enough" (Janis Oliver Gill, Waldman, Rick Vincent) – 3:12
"Devil and Your Deep Blue Eyes" (Russell Smith, Lee Roy Parnell) – 2:51
"(Our Love Is Like) Silver and Gold" (Janis Oliver Gill, Wendy Waldman) – 3:44
"Be Good to Me" (Janis Oliver Gill, Wendy Waldman, Rick Vincent) – 3:00
"Watch Me Run" (Janis Oliver Gill, Andy Landis) – 2:56
"Sisters (Best of Friends)" (Janis Oliver Gill, Wendy Waldman, Kristine Arnold) – 3:29

Personnel
Sweethearts of the Rodeo
 Kristine Arnold – vocals
 Janis Gill – vocals, acoustic guitar

Additional Musicians
 Sam Bush – mandolin
 Bobby Clark – mandolin
 Stuart Duncan – fiddle
 Vince Gill – electric guitar
 Roy Huskey Jr. – upright bass
 Terry McMillan – harmonica
 Kenny Malone – drums, percussion
 Joey Miskulin – accordion
 Pete Wasner – keyboards

References 

1992 albums
Sweethearts of the Rodeo albums
Columbia Records albums
Albums produced by Steve Buckingham (record producer)